This is a list of bridges of the Nechako River in the Canadian province of British Columbia. This list is in sequence from the Nechako's mouth at the Fraser River in Prince George, and then going upstream to the Nechako Reservoir.

Prince George

Vanderhoof to Nechako Reservoir

See also

List of crossings of the Thompson River
List of crossings of the Fraser River

Nechako River
Lists of river crossings
Nechako
Crossings